Cavit Gökalp (born 1938) is a Turkish former footballer. He competed in the men's tournament at the 1960 Summer Olympics.

References

External links
 
 

1938 births
Living people
Turkish footballers
Olympic footballers of Turkey
Footballers at the 1960 Summer Olympics
Sportspeople from Adapazarı
Association football goalkeepers
Beşiktaş J.K. footballers